This is a list of viceroys in Saint Vincent and the Grenadines from British settlement in 1763 until it gained independence from the United Kingdom in 1979.

Lieutenant Governors of Saint Vincent (1763–1776) 
George Maddison, 1763–1764
Joseph Higginson, 1764–1766
Lauchlin McLean, 1766
Ulysses FitzMaurice, 1766–1772
Valentin Morris, 1772–1776

Governors of Saint Vincent (1776–1833) 
Valentin Morris, 1776–1779, continued
Charles-Marie de Trolong du Rumain, 1779 (French occupation)
Antoine Dumontet, 1779–1780 (French occupation)
Philibert-François Rouxel de Blanchelande 1780–1781 (French occupation)
Jean-Baptiste Vigoureux Duplessis, 1781–1782 (French occupation)
Pierre-Jean-François de Feydeau, March 1782–1783, interim (French occupation)
Edmund Lincoln, 1783–1787
James Seton, 1787–1798
William Bentinck, 1798–1802
Henry William Bentinck, 1802–1806
Robert Paul (1st time)(acting) 1805–1806
George Beckwith, 1806–1808
Robert Paul (2nd time)(acting) 1807
Charles Brisbane, 1808–1829
Robert Paul (3rd time)(acting) 1808–1809
Robert Paul (4th time)(acting) 1810–1812
Robert Paul (5th time)(acting) 1816–1817
William John Struth, 1829–1831, acting
Sir George Hill, Bt 1831–1833

Lieutenant Governors of Saint Vincent (1833–1886) 
In 1833, Saint Vincent and the Grenadines became part of the British Windward Islands.  A lieutenant governor was appointing in Saint Vincent, subordinate to the Governor of Barbados (to 1885) or the Governor of the Windward Islands (from 1885).

George Tyler, 1833–1842
Richard Doherty, 1842–1845
John Campbell, 1845–1853
Richard Graves MacDonnell, 1853–1854
Edward John Eyre, 1854–1861
Anthony Musgrave, 1861–1864
George Berkeley 1864–1871
William Hepburn Rennie, 1871–1875
George Dundas, 1875–1880
Augustus Frederick Gore, 1880–1886

Administrators of Saint Vincent (1886–1969) 
Robert Baxter Llewelyn, 1886–1889
Irwin Charles Maling, 1889–1893
John Hartley Sandwith, 1893–1895
Harry Langhorne Thompson, 1895–1901
Edward John Cameron, 1901–1909
Charles Gideon Murray, 1909–1915
Reginald Popham Lobb, 1915–1923
Robert Walter, 1923–1929
Herbert Walter Peebles, 1929–1933
Arthur Francis Grimble, 1933–1936
Arthur Alban Wright, 1936–1938
William Bain Gray, 1938–1941
Alexander Elder Beattie, 1941–1944
Ronald Herbert Garvey, 1944–1948
Walter Coutts, 1948–1955
Alexander Falconer Giles, 1955–1961
Samuel Horatio Graham, 1961–1966
John Lionel Chapman, 1966–1967
Hywel George, 1967–27 October 1969

Governors of Saint Vincent and the Grenadines (1969–1979) 
On 27 October 1969, Saint Vincent and the Grenadines became an associated state of the United Kingdom, responsible for its own internal affairs.

Hywel George, 27 October 1969–27 October 1970, continued''
Rupert Godfrey John, 27 October 1970 – 1976
Sidney Gun-Munro, 1976–27 October 1979 

On 27 October 1979, Saint Vincent and the Grenadines gained independence from the United Kingdom. For a list of viceroys after independence, see the list of Governors-General, starting with Sidney Gun-Munro continuing in post.

See also

History of Saint Vincent and the Grenadines

References
World Statesmen

 
History of Saint Vincent and the Grenadines
Saint Vincent
Government of Saint Vincent and the Grenadines

Colonial governors